Letenye is a district in south-western part of Zala County. Letenye is also the name of the town where the district seat is found. The district is located in the Western Transdanubia Statistical Region.

Geography 
Letenye District borders with Lenti District to the northwest, Zalaegerszeg District to the north, Nagykanizsa District to the east, the Croatian county of Međimurje and Slovenia to the southwest. The number of inhabited places in Letenye District is 27.
The seat of the Letenye district was Letenye since the first designation of the permanent district seats (1886).

Municipalities 
The district has 1 town and 26 villages.
(ordered by population, as of 1 January 2013)

The bolded municipality is city.

See also
List of cities and towns in Hungary

References

External links
 Postal codes of the Letenye District

Districts in Zala County